Perittopus asiaticus is a species of riffle bug from Malaysia, China, and Thailand.

References

Further reading

 
 

Veliidae
Insects described in 2001
Insects of China
Insects of Thailand
Insects of Malaysia